Luna Park was an amusement park in the North Oakland neighborhood of the city of Pittsburgh, Pennsylvania, USA, from 1905 to 1909. Constructed and owned by Frederick Ingersoll, the park occupied a 16 acre hilly site bounded on the south by Atlantic Avenue (now Baum Boulevard) and on the west by North Craig Street, and included roller coasters, picnic pavilions, carousels, a fun house, a Ferris wheel, a roller rink, a shoot-the-chutes ride, a concert shell, a dance hall, bumper cars, and a baby incubator exhibit. In its brief existence, the park featured regular performances of bands, acrobatic acts, animal acts, horse riders, and aerial acts.

Pittsburgh's Luna Park was the first Ingersoll park of that name (out of 44) (Luna Park, Cleveland, also owned and built by Ingersoll, opened soon afterward), and the first amusement park to be covered with electrical lighting (67,000 light bulbs). The park cost $375,000 to construct; re-creating it from scratch would cost approximately $8.5 million.

The Pittsburgh and (the similar) Cleveland Luna Parks were the beginnings of the world's first amusement park chain: by 1929 (the year of Ingersoll's death), 44 Luna Parks were constructed around the world.  Remnants of the entertainment empire remain, from Mexico City (the park is now called Luna Loca) to Melbourne to Athens (now called Ta Aidonakia).

The cost of upgrading and maintaining his amusement parks proved too much for Ingersoll as he was forced to declare bankruptcy in 1908. Several of the Luna Parks were sold to others; Pittsburgh's park was closed in 1909 in the face of competition of a second trolley park nearby, the older (and still-existing) Kennywood Park. When Kennywood expanded its fairgrounds in 1995, its new Lost Kennywood section was patterned after its former competitor, centered on a shoot-the-chutes ride and having a one-third-scale replica of the Luna Park entrance as a "gateway" to the park, including an era-appropriate spelling of "Pittsburg".

Aside from the aforementioned tribute from Kennywood, no other remnants exist to the existence of Luna Park, including a lack of historical markers. The site itself is currently a mixed-use property with both residential and commercial businesses.

References

Event venues established in 1905
Amusement parks in Pennsylvania
Buildings and structures in Allegheny County, Pennsylvania
1905 establishments in Pennsylvania
1909 disestablishments in Pennsylvania
Defunct amusement parks in Pennsylvania
History of Pittsburgh